Krasnoselkupsky District (Selkup: Нярӄый щёй ӄумый район) is an administrative and municipal district (raion), one of the seven in Yamalo-Nenets Autonomous Okrug of Tyumen Oblast, Russia. It is located in the southeast of the autonomous okrug. Its administrative center is the rural locality (a selo) of Krasnoselkup. Population: 6,204 (2010 Census);  The population of Krasnoselkup accounts for 64.1% of the district's total population.

Geography
Lake Chyortovo, a chain of lakes, is located in the district. The Taz and its tributary the Toka are the main rivers.

References

Notes

Sources

Districts of Yamalo-Nenets Autonomous Okrug